Virimi Vakatawa (born 1 May 1992) is a Fijian-born French former professional rugby union player who played as a centre or a wing for Racing 92 and the French national team.

Arrived in France in 2010 and having obtained a French passport, he joined the France sevens team in 2014 before playing for the France national rugby union team since 2016 and the Six Nations Championship.

In September 2022, he suddenly retired from professional rugby due to a heart condition.

Early life
Vakatawa was born in Rangiora, New Zealand on 1 May 1992, before moving to Naluwai, Fiji, his family village in Naitasiri Province. He holds Fijian citizenship and started rugby with his hometown club at 9 years old. He then joined Nasinu Secondary School, a famous rugby playing school in Fiji. He played both rugby league and rugby union before joining the Fiji national under-19 rugby union team at 17 years old.

Club career
Vakatawa was spotted and recruited by France-based Fijian winger Sireli Bobo, joining Racing Métro 92 in 2010. He was mentored by another former flying Fijian in Simon Raiwalui. He played his first game in the 2010–11 Heineken Cup where he scored his first try against Leinster.

On 13 June 2017, it was confirmed that he would be rejoining Racing 92 for the 2017–18 season.

He ended the 2018–19 Top 14 season as the top try-scorer for the competition with 13 tries.

He lost in final with his team in the 2017–18 European Rugby Champions Cup and the 2019–20 European Rugby Champions Cup.

On 5 September 2022, Racing 92 unexpectedly announced that Vakatawa was forced to retire from professional rugby, with immediate effect, due to a cardiac pathology.

International career
In 2013, Vakatawa became eligible to represent France. He was released from his contract by Racing 92 and joined the French sevens team. He became a star in rugby sevens for France and played at 2016 Summer Olympics in Rio de Janeiro.

He won the 2014 Rugby Europe Sevens Grand Prix Series and the 2015 Rugby Europe Sevens Grand Prix Series with the France sevens team, and was chosen in the 2015-16 World Rugby Sevens Series dream team.

On 19 January 2016, Vakatawa was named in France's rugby union squad for the Six Nations Tournament by Guy Novès. He has been labelled as the French answer to All Black Sonny Bill Williams. He made his debut against Italy scoring a try.

On 24 May 2016, Vakatawa signed a two-year deal with the FFR so that he would exclusively play for the French 7s and 15s national teams.

In October 2016, he was included again in the French 15's team even though he has yet to play for a Top 14 team. He played his first game on the wing against Samoa, scoring three tries. He played a week later against Australia scoring a try in their 23-25 loss. He partnered Noa Nakaitaci on the wings and was renamed alongside Noa in their final test of the year against New Zealand. He was also named in the French 7's team for the 2016 Dubai Sevens a week later and won the first-ever DHL Impact Player of the Tournament award. With France, he finished in the third place in the 2017 Six Nations Championship.

On 13 June 2017, it was announced that Vakatawa and the Federation had agreed to release him from his contract so that he could be able to find a club and play rugby union full-time. As part of this new deal however, he would still be available for the 2018 Rugby World Cup Sevens in the Bay Area but was ultimately not called up in the squad. He played his last game with the France sevens team at the 2017 Paris Sevens and was never called up to the team again.   

In 2019, he played with France at the Rugby World Cup in Japan, scoring two tries in three games.

Vakatawa finished second with France national team again in the 2020 Six Nations Championship and the 2021 Six Nations Championship.

International tries

Playing style
Vakatawa is very versatile, being comfortable at the centre and at the wing, even if he prefers to play as a centre. He was progressively moved at the outside centre by his former Racing 92 backs coach Laurent Labit, who then coached him in the France national team. Virimi Vakatawa is regarded as possessing high pace, power and intelligence. His offloads passes are also very praised and he is renowned for his acceleration, footwork, vision and creativity to find spaces and exploit gaps in defences.

Personal life
Vakatawa obtained French nationality after learning French language and France national anthem La Marseillaise.  

His cousin is Fijian-born French international rugby union player Noa Nakaitaci.

Honours

Racing 92
 European Rugby Champions Cup runner-up: 2017–18, 2019–20

France
 Six Nations Championship runner-up: 2020, 2021

France 7's
 Sevens Grand Prix Series: 2014, 2015

References

External links 
 France profile
 EPCR profile
 
 

1992 births
Living people
People from Naitasiri Province
French rugby union players
French people of Fijian descent
Racing 92 players
Rugby union wings
Rugby union centres
I-Taukei Fijian people
Rugby sevens players at the 2016 Summer Olympics
Olympic rugby sevens players of France
France international rugby sevens players
France international rugby union players